Tashkent Museum of Railway Equipment is a railway museum in Tashkent and is the only such museum in Uzbekistan.

History 
The museum opened on August 4, 1989, at the 100-year anniversary of the first railways in Central Asia. The museum sponsors exhibits on the development of railway technologies in Uzbekistan in the second half of the 20th century.

Contents 
The museum hosts 13 steam engines, 18 diesel and 3 electric locomotives that were used across Uzbekistan to pull different types of wagons - many of which are also on display. The equipment required to operate a railway e.g. signals, semaphore and radio and paraphernalia such as emblems, tools and uniforms of the machinists is included.

The oldest example of railway engine that can be seen there is an OV engine 1534 ("The Lamb"), which has 700 horsepower, was made in 1914, and reached a speed of 55 km/h. The most powerful engine presented in the museum is P 36 ("Victory"), which has about 3000 horsepower. The engine was invented in 1833–1834 by Efim and Makar Cherepanovs and was used up to 1956 when replaced with diesel locomotives – the locomotives of 1961 could reach a speed of 60 km/h.

The museum offers a ride on one of the oldest trains, along a track that is almost 1 km long, through its grounds.

Steam Locomotives

Diesel Locomotives

Electric Locomotives

Maintenance-of-Way Equipment

Passenger Equipment

References

External links 

Information about the museum in Uzbek
Information about the museum in Uzbek
Article about the museum in English
Article about the museum in Uzbek

Museums in Tashkent
Railway museums in Uzbekistan
Rail transport in Uzbekistan